Dornas is a commune in the Ardèche department in southern France. This town is located 6 miles from Le Cheylard, 25 miles from Aubenas, and 29 miles from Privas.

Population

See also
Communes of the Ardèche department

References

Communes of Ardèche
Ardèche communes articles needing translation from French Wikipedia

zh:多尔纳